Lee Myong-Seung (also Lee Myeong-Seung, ; born August 14, 1979 in Seoul) is a South Korean marathon runner. He set a personal best time of 2:13:25, by finishing ninth at the 2010 Seoul International Marathon. In the same year, he achieved his best career result with a fourth-place finish at the Gyeongju International Marathon, clocking at 2:16:19.

Lee made his official debut for the 2004 Summer Olympics in Athens, where he placed forty-first out of a hundred runners in the marathon, with a time of 2:21:01.

At the 2008 Summer Olympics in Beijing, Lee qualified for the second time in the men's marathon, along with his teammates Kim Yi-Yong and Lee Bong-Ju. He successfully finished the race in eighteenth place by seven seconds ahead of Finland's Janne Holmen, posting his best Olympic career time of 2:14:37.

References

External links

NBC Olympics Profile

South Korean male marathon runners
Living people
Olympic athletes of South Korea
Athletes (track and field) at the 2004 Summer Olympics
Athletes (track and field) at the 2008 Summer Olympics
Sportspeople from Seoul
1979 births
21st-century South Korean people